Pabstiella wawraeana is a species of orchid native to southern Brazil.

References

wawraeana
Flora of Brazil